Linguistics and Language: A Survey of Basic Concepts and Implications is a textbook by Julia S. Falk in which the author provides an introduction to linguistics. It is a well-known introductory text in linguistics.

Reception
The book has been reviewed by Carolyn Steedman and Nicole Domingue.

References 

1973 non-fiction books
Linguistics textbooks
Wiley (publisher) books